The A4113 road is a single-carriageway road that runs from Knighton in Powys to Bromfield in Shropshire, United Kingdom, passing through north Herefordshire.

The route then follows a Roman Road north through the Roman village of Leintwardine, leaving the Teme behind.

Route (west to east)
Knighton – junction with A488 road
Milebrook
Heartsease
Wales (Powys) – England (Herefordshire) border
Brampton Bryan
Walford
junction with the A4110 road
Leintwardine
Lower Todding
Highest elevation:  (at Mocktree)
Fiddler's Elbow (hairpin bend)
Herefordshire – Shropshire border
Bromfield – junction with the A49 trunk road

References

Roads in England
Roads in Wales
Transport in Herefordshire
Transport in Powys
Transport in Shropshire